Sin vergüenza (literally Without Shame) is a 2001 Spanish comedy-drama film directed by Joaquín Oristrell and written by Dominic Harari, Joaquín Oristrell, Teresa Pelegri and Cristina Rota. The films received two Goya Award nominations, winning one.

Cast
 Verónica Forqué - Isabel
 Daniel Giménez Cacho - Mario
 Candela Peña - Cecilia
 Carmen Balagué - Nacha
 Elvira Lindo - analista
 Jorge Sanz - Alberto
 Rosa Maria Sardà - Ronda
 Dani Martín - Felipe
 Marta Etura - Belén

Awards and nominations

Won
Goya Awards
Best Supporting Actress (Rosa Maria Sardà)

Nominated
Goya Awards
Best Screenplay – Original (Dominic Harari, Joaquín Oristrell, Teresa Pelegri and Cristina Rota)

See also 
 List of Spanish films of 2001

External links
 

2001 films
Spanish comedy-drama films
2000s Spanish-language films
2000s Spanish films
2001 comedy-drama films